Frode Hagen (born July 23, 1974) is a retired Norwegian handball player. He played 188 matches and scored 574 goals for the Norway men's national handball team between 1994 and 2008. He participated at the 2001 and 2005 World Men's Handball Championship.

References

1974 births
Living people
Norwegian male handball players
Norwegian expatriate sportspeople in Spain
Sportspeople from Drammen